Jeolgang Seo clan is one of the Korean clans. Their Bon-gwan is in Zhejiang, China. According to the research held in 2000, the number of Jeolgang Seo clan’s member was 623. Their founder was  who was a great-grandchild of Seo Hae ryong. Seo Hae ryong was from Zhejiang and worked as Ministry of Rites (Lǐbù) in Ming dynasty.  worked as a general and was dispatched to Joseon as Ming dynasty’s reinforcements. Then, he was settled in Seongju County, North Gyeongsang Province and founded Jeolgang Seo clan.

See also 
 Korean clan names of foreign origin

References

External links 
 

 
Korean clan names of Chinese origin
Seo clans